Ian Ormondroyd (born 22 September 1964) is an English former professional footballer who made more than 350 appearances in the Football League and Premier League. He became famous for his height and build, in a similar manner to that of Peter Crouch.

Club career
Born in Bradford, Yorkshire, Ormondroyd played for Bradford City, Oldham Athletic, Aston Villa, Derby County, Leicester City, Hull City and Scunthorpe United. He was Leicester's record signing in 1992 when he joined from Derby for £350,000.

At the age of 33, Ormondroyd retired from football due to arthritis in his left ankle.

Personal life
He returned to Bradford City as football in the community officer, and also works as a commentator and match day summariser for Bradford City games with Pulse Radio.

His son, Jack, plays rugby league for the Salford Red Devils  in the Super League.

References

External links

Sporting-heroes.net

1964 births
Living people
Footballers from Bradford
Association football forwards
English footballers
Thackley F.C. players
Bradford City A.F.C. players
Oldham Athletic A.F.C. players
Aston Villa F.C. players
Derby County F.C. players
Leicester City F.C. players
Hull City A.F.C. players
Scunthorpe United F.C. players
Premier League players
English Football League players
Bradford City A.F.C. non-playing staff